Great Whittington is a village and former civil parish, now in the parish of Whittington, in Northumberland, England, 7 miles NE of Hexham. In 1951 the parish had a population of 158.

Governance 
Great Whittington is in the parliamentary constituency of Hexham. Great Whittington was formerly a township in Corbridge parish, from 1866 Great Whittington was a civil parish in its own right until it was abolished on 1 April 1955 to form Whittington.

History 
Immediately north of Great Whittington, in a field west of the Unnamed Road leading to Matfen, lies Great Whittington Royal Observer Corps Monitoring Post. This was 1 of approx. 1,563 underground monitoring posts built all over the UK during the Cold War to monitor the effects of a Nuclear Strike. They were operated by the ROC who were mostly civilian volunteers. Great Whittington ROC post was opened in June 1962 and closed in September 1992 after the collapse of the Soviet Union, which saw the end of the Cold War.

Landmarks
The causeway was a Roman road which started at Portgate on Hadrian's Wall, north of Corbridge, and extended  northwards across Northumberland to the mouth of the River Tweed at Berwick-upon-Tweed.

Transport 
Great Whittington is served by Go North East's 74 bus service, which provides four buses per day to Newcastle upon Tyne, Ponteland and Hexham.

Religious sites 
A now deconsecrated Wesleyan church can be found on the northern side of the village green, distinguishable by a large cross above the door.

See also
Halton
Matfen

References

 The Official Great Whittington Website 
 Geanology archives 
đá

External linkss
 
 Whittington, as seen from the south

Villages in Northumberland
Former civil parishes in Northumberland